John Newsome Crossley (born 28 September 1937, Yorkshire, England) is a British-Australian mathematician and logician who writes in the field of logic in computer science, history of mathematics and medieval history. He is involved in the field of mathematical logic in Australia and South East Asia.

As of 2010, Crossley is Emeritus Professor of Logic at Monash University, Australia, to which he has been connected since 1968.

Biography
Crossley was educated at Queen Elizabeth Grammar School, Wakefield, and then went up to St John's College, Oxford. He was a Harmsworth Senior Scholar at Merton College from 1960 to 1962, before taking up a one-year Junior Research Fellowship there; he received his DPhil and MA (Mathematics) in 1963. His early career was spent at Oxford where he was the first university lecturer in mathematical logic and was a Fellow of All Souls College, Oxford. He is still a Quondam Fellow there. He was offered a Readership position and following a lecturing visit to Monash University in 1968, he was elected to a Chair in Pure Mathematics. He accepted this position and as of 2010, Crossley continues to be active at Monash University where he serves through its Faculty of Information Technology.

Crossley has written books in logic, mathematics and computer science. He is known as the lead author of the book What is Mathematical Logic. Co-written with some of his students, the book popularized the subject to the interested layman. Many of Crossley's doctoral students have gone on to be professors themselves and have written books in the field of mathematics or computing, including Peter Aczel, Wilfrid Hodges, John Lane Bell and Rod Downey.

Crossley is also an avid photographer. In 1974 he first exhibited his photographs in Melbourne and again in 2005 he exhibited Composition and Context, a collection of photographs shot by Crossley around the world that illustrates the title and theme of the exhibition. A number of these photographs since have appeared in publications in Australia, Britain and the Philippines.

Publications

Books
Constructive Order Types John  N. Crossley  North-Holland Publishing Company, Amsterdam, 1969
What is Mathematical Logic John N. Crossley et al. Oxford University Press, 1972
Combinatorial Functors John  N. Crossley and Anil Nerode, Ergebnisse der Mathematik und ihrer Grenzgebiete, Springer, Berlin, 1974
The emergence of number John Newsome Crossley, World Scientific, Singapore, 1987
Nine Chapters on the Mathematical Art -- Companion & Commentary, Shen Kangshen, John N. Crossley and Anthony W.-C. Lun. Oxford University Press, 1999
Adapting proofs-as-programs: The Curry-Howard Protocol,  Iman Hafiz Poernomo, John Newsome Crossley and Martin Wirsing,  Springer Monographs in Computer Science, Springer, New York, 2005
Growing ideas of number John N. Crossley Australian Council for Educational Research, Camberwell, 2007
Ars musice Constant J. Mews, John N. Crossley, Catherine Jeffreys, Leigh McKinnon, and Carol Williams (ed and trans.),  Johannes de Grocheio. Consortium on the Teaching of the Middle Ages (TEAMS), Kalamazoo, MI., 2011

References

External links
 John Gough's Article
 Monash Library Search: Publications 1990–2009
 Homepage of John N. Crossley

1937 births
Living people
Scientists from Yorkshire
English mathematicians
English logicians
Academic staff of Monash University
Fellows of All Souls College, Oxford
Australian logicians
Australian philosophers
English philosophers
Alumni of Merton College, Oxford
Fellows of Merton College, Oxford
Alumni of St John's College, Oxford